Anhalt is an electoral constituency (German: Wahlkreis) represented in the Bundestag. It elects one member via first-past-the-post voting. Under the current constituency numbering system, it is designated as constituency 71. It is located in central Saxony-Anhalt, comprising the Anhalt-Bitterfeld district and most of the Salzlandkreis district.

Anhalt was created for the 2002 federal election. Since 2021, it has been represented by Kay-Uwe Ziegler of the Alternative for Germany (AfD).

Geography
Anhalt is located in central Saxony-Anhalt. As of the 2021 federal election, it comprises the district of Anhalt-Bitterfeld as well as the Salzlandkreis district excluding the municipalities of Aschersleben, Barby, Bördeland, Calbe, Schönebeck, Seeland.

History
Anhalt was created in 2002 and contained parts of the abolished constituencies of Dessau – Bitterfeld, Halle-Neustadt – Saalkreis – Köthen, and Wittenberg – Gräfenhainichen – Jessen – Roßlau – Zerbst. In the 2002 and 2005 elections, it was constituency 71 in the numbering system. In the 2009 election, it was number 72. Since the 2013 election, it has been number 71.

Originally, it comprised the independent city of Dessau and the districts of Köthen and Wittenberg. It was reconfigured ahead of the 2009 election, losing most of its former territory from the Wittenberg district and gaining area in the new Salzlandkreis and Anhalt-Bitterfeld districts.

Members
The constituency was first represented by Engelbert Wistuba of the Social Democratic Party (SPD) from 2002 to 2009. It was won by Jan Korte of The Left in 2009. In 2013, Kees de Vries of the Christian Democratic Union (CDU) was elected representative. He was re-elected in 2017. Kay-Uwe Ziegler won the constituency for the Alternative for Germany (AfD) in 2021.

Election results

2021 election

2017 election

2013 election

2009 election

References

Federal electoral districts in Saxony-Anhalt
2002 establishments in Germany
Constituencies established in 2002